Katie Griffin (born January 14, 1973) is a Canadian actress and singer. She has had roles in several television movies and feature films. In cartoons, her best-known roles include the voices of Sailor Mars in the original English Canadian dub of Sailor Moon, and Alex in Totally Spies!. She is also the voice of Laugh-a-Lot Bear in Care Bears: Journey to Joke-a-lot and as a plush toy. She also voiced Farmer Shire in Corn & Peg.

Biography
Griffin grew up in Scarborough, Ontario. Her mother was a teacher, and her father was an air traffic controller. When she was 8, she attended Edgewood Junior Public School and played the role of The Artful Dodger in her school play, which garnered notice from her mother, who was the school director, of her talent.  Looking back at that period, Griffin said that she was more inspired by watching movies than theatre, especially concerning strong women, and cited her mom as a huge influence. Griffin also attended David and Mary Thomson Collegiate Institute.

Griffin got her break into acting when she was 15 when she participated in a play at the Ryerson Theatre and was noticed by an agent. She was booked for local commercials and television spots in Canada as well as television movie specials. After graduating high school, she switched agents and continued with her acting gigs. When she was attending Ryerson Polytechnical Institute, she was offered a role in the television film "Up to Now" but it caused a conflict where she had to choose between acting or studying.

Griffin's first major role in an animated series was Sailor Mars in Sailor Moon, which at the time she had not realized was going to be popular. She was recommended to audition by Rino Romano, who voiced Tuxedo Mask. She described the role with Serena as best friends who sometimes fight, but not really the bully persona that was shown.  She would record about two to three episodes a week, and it was not difficult on her voice. She likes that Mars is "fiercely loyal, strong, loves martial arts, sings... and the fact that she can summon fire and destroy evil, lol, Rei and I are very similar in character."

In the animated TV series Braceface, Griffin voices Nina, a mean eighth-grader girl who gives the title character her moniker. In the Moon Chase interview, Griffin said "I don’t think I have one single thing in common with Nina, so it was fun playing that role. I guess in the end, I like playing badass kind of characters."

In voicing Alex in Totally Spies!, Griffin used a higher vocal register than usual. She was worried about nodules developing, and being recast when the series returned for season 6 following a hiatus, but was happy when she could return. She found the part to be really fun, easy to play, and liked that Alex was so lovely to animals. She notes that about the only thing Alex and Raye (Sailor Mars) have in common is their ability to kick some ass.
She also voiced the character Ruby in Max & Ruby and Mary of the Geniuses and Miles of the Vegans in Total Drama Presents: The Ridonculous Race.

In live-action acting, she starred alongside Rob Lowe as his love interest in Too Late to Say Goodbye. She also worked with Nicole Kidman and Glenn Close.

Music career
Some of Griffin's influences in her music style include: Sarah McLachlan, Madonna, The Tragically Hip, as well as alternative music bands Hole, Foo Fighters, No Doubt, and Radiohead. She enjoys singing but realized she wasn't going to get a record deal by just that. She learned guitar and began writing songs. Following one of the commercial voice-over jobs where she sang a jingle, she played some acoustic songs and her friend suggested she get her songs produced in an album. She was introduced to Michael Kulas of the band James. Kulas was able to produce many of her acoustic songs so that they became more of a pop/rock album. The album title Kiss Me Chaos was based on the Kiss Me, Kate musical, as she describes herself as being pretty strong and like "Kate the Shrew". It released in streaming service in February 2020.

Personal life
Griffin is married to musician Michael Kulas. They have two children. Griffin enjoys martial arts films, playing guitar, and playing/watching hockey. She has a younger sister named Becky.

Filmography

Live-action

Live-action feature films
 Boulevard (1994) – Lorraine
 To Die For (1995) – Girl at Bar
 Getting Away with Murder (1996) – Student (uncredited)
 The Real Blonde (1998) – Empty V Interviewer
 The Safety of Objects (2001) – Female Contestant #1, Sue
 Swindle (2002) – Judy
 Aurora Borealis (2005) – Sandy

Live-action direct-to-video and television films
 The World's Oldest Living Bridesmaid (1990) – Interviewee #2
 The Good Fight (1992) – Shelly
 Salem Witch Trails (1992) – Abigail Williams
 Getting Gotti (1994) – April
 Fatal Vows: The Alexandra O'Hara Story (1994) – Anna
 Prince of a Day (1995) – Gina
 Up to Now (1995)
 Electra (1996) – Mary Anne Parker
 Mr. Music (1998) – Profound Reporter
 Ricky Nelson: The Original Teen Idol (1999) – June Blair
 Black and Blue (1999) – Jennifer, Brunette Wife
 Daydream Believers: The Monkees Story (2000) – Award Presenter
 Lucky Day (2002) – Penny
 Power and Beauty (2002) – Jacqueline Exner
 Protection (2001) – Gina
 America's Prince: The John F. Kennedy Jr. Story (2003) – Shrine Girl #1
 Candles on Bay Street (2006) – Naomi
 The Death of Alice Blue (2009) – Katie
 Too Late to Say Goodbye (2009) – Dara Prentice
 Desperately Seeking Santa (2011) – Sonia Moretti
 Z-Baw (2012) – Berdi

Live-action television series
 My Secret Identity (1990–1991) – Allison Nesbitt, Renee
 Are You Afraid of the Dark? (1992) – Dede (Tale of the Prom Queen)
 Katts and Dog (1993)
 Boogies Diner (1994) – Nikki
 Kung Fu: The Legend Continues (1994) – Girl #1
 Side Effects (1994) – Resident
 DNA (1994)
 Forever Knight (1995) – Jill
 The Great Defender (1995) – Receptionist
 Psi Factor: Chronicles of the Paranormal (1997–1998) – Amanda Sanderson, Mansfield's Sister
 The Adventures of Sinbad (1998) – Taryn
 Mythic Warriors: Guardians of the Legend (1998) – Siren #4
 Traders (1999)
 Total Recall 2070 (1999) – Attendant
 Earth: Final Conflict (1999) – Giselle
 The Associates (2001) – Bronwyn
 Doc (2003) – Diane Lang
 Wild Card (2004) – Cosmetics Customer
 Kevin Hill (2005) – Melissa Marsden
 Billable Hours (2006) – Receptionist
 The Best Years (2009) – Mom
 The Dating Guy (2009) – Girl #1, Zena, Charity
 Cra$h & Burn (2010) – Maya Porter
 The L.A. Complex (2012) – Stacey
 Annedroids (2013) – Nick's Mom – Pilot episode only
 Good Witch – Monica – Episode: "In Sickness and in Health"

Other appearances

Voice-over

Voice-over roles in feature film
 Totally Spies! The Movie (2010) – Alex & Caitlin
 The Nut Job (2014) – Pigeon

Voice-over roles in direct-to-video and television films
 Sailor Moon R the Movie: The Promise of the Rose (2000) – Raye Hino/Sailor Mars
 Sailor Moon S the Movie: Hearts in Ice (2000) – Raye Hino/Sailor Mars
 Sailor Moon SuperS The Movie: (2000) – Raye Hino/Sailor Mars
 Rescue Heroes: The Movie (2003) – Penny Pooler
 Care Bears: Journey to Joke-a-lot (2004) – Laugh-a-Lot Bear
 Care Bears: Big Wish Movie (2005) - Laugh-a-Lot Bear
 Beyblade: Fierce Battle (2004) – Ashley, Shadow Blader #2
 The Magic Hockey Stick (2012) – Mom – CBC Christmas Special

Voice-over dubbing recast roles in anime
 Sailor Moon (1995–2000) – Rei/Raye (Sailor Mars) (1995 and 2000)
 Beyblade (2002) – Mathilda, Additional Voices
 Interlude (2005) – Kaoruko Minegishi
 Bakugan Battle Brawlers (2008) – Julie Makimoto, Oberus, Daisy Makimoto, Makoto, Wavern
 Bakugan New Vestroia (2009) - Julie Makimoto
 Bakugan: Gundalian Invaders (2010) – Julie Makimoto
 Bakugan: Mechtanium Surge (2011) – Julie Makimoto, Sellon
 Beyblade: Metal Fusion (2011) – Hikaru Hazama
 Beyblade: Metal Masters (2011) – Hikaru Hazama, Mei-Mei

Voice-over roles in other television
 Braceface (2001) – Nina Harper
 Undergrads (2001) – Charity
 Cyberchase (2002–present) - Calliope (episode: Out of Sync), Brigitt (episode: Missing Bats In Sensible Flats)
 Totally Spies! (2004–15) –  Alex (Seasons 3-6), Caitlin, Mindy, others
 6teen (2005) – Lydia, Gwen
 Team Galaxy (2006) – Yoko
 Will & Dewitt (2007–2008) – Mom
 The Amazing Spiez! (2009) – Alex
 Dex Hamilton: Alien Entomologist (2008) – Jane
 Stoked (2010) - Amber Green
 Skatoony (2010) - Posh Botts
 MetaJets (2011) – Maggie Strong/Foxtrot
 Redakai: Conquer the Kairu (2011–2012) – Zair
 Franny's Feet – Additional Voices
 Julius Jr. – The Tooth Fairy
 Traffix – Oona
 Inspector Gadget (2015 TV series) (2015–2018) – Kayla
 Total Drama Presents: The Ridonculous Race (2015–2016) – Mary (1 episode), Miles (5 episodes)
 Magiki (2016–2018) (Canadian dub)
 Mysticons (2017–18) - Kitty Boon
 Cloudy with a Chance of Meatballs (2017-2018) - Sam Sparks
 The Great Northern Candy Drop (2017)
 Agent Binky: Pets of the Universe - (2019–present) Big Human
 Remy & Boo (2020–present) - Remy's Mom
 Glowbies (2021–present) - Oily
 Go, Dog. Go! (2021–present) - Ma Barker

Discography
 Albums
 Kiss Me Chaos (2003)

Notes

References

External links
 Katie Griffin at Maple Music
 
 
 

1973 births
Living people
Actresses from Toronto
Canadian child actresses
Canadian women pop singers
Canadian women rock singers
Canadian film actresses
Canadian television actresses
Canadian voice actresses
Musicians from Toronto
People from Scarborough, Toronto
Toronto Metropolitan University alumni
20th-century Canadian actresses
21st-century Canadian actresses
20th-century Canadian women singers
21st-century Canadian women singers